Giovanni Giacomo Barba or Jean Jacques Barba (1490 – 1 October 1565) was a Roman Catholic prelate who served as Bishop of Terni (1553–1565) and Bishop of Teramo (1546–1553).

Biography
Giovanni Giacomo Barba was born in Naples, Italy in 1490 and ordained a priest in the Order of Saint Augustine.
On 26 May 1546, he was appointed during the papacy of Pope Paul III as Bishop of Teramo. On 6 June 1546, he was consecrated bishop by Girolamo Maccabei de Toscanella, Bishop of Castro del Lazio, with Cristoforo Spiriti, Bishop of Cesena, and Luigi Magnasco di Santa Fiora, Bishop of Assisi, serving as co-consecrators. On 3 July 1553, he was appointed during the papacy of Pope Julius III as Bishop of Terni. He served as Bishop of Terni until his death on 1 October 1565.

Episcopal succession

See also 
Catholic Church in Italy

References

External links and additional sources
 (for Chronology of Bishops) 
 (for Chronology of Bishops) 
 (for Chronology of Bishops) 
 (for Chronology of Bishops) 

16th-century Italian Roman Catholic bishops
Bishops appointed by Pope Paul III
Bishops appointed by Pope Julius III
1490 births
1565 deaths
Augustinian bishops